Mark Steven Ward (born 27 January 1982) is an English former footballer who played as a forward for Sheffield United.

Playing career
Ward began his career with Sheffield United, where he made two appearances in the Football League Championship before being released. He went on to play for non-League teams Worksop Town, Hucknall Town, Frickley Athletic, Stocksbridge Park Steels and Belper Town.

References

1982 births
Living people
English footballers
Footballers from Sheffield
Association football forwards
Northern Premier League players
Sheffield United F.C. players
Stocksbridge Park Steels F.C. players
Worksop Town F.C. players
Frickley Athletic F.C. players
Hucknall Town F.C. players
Belper Town F.C. players
English football managers
A.F.C. Mansfield managers